Malcolm Budd  (born 23 December 1941) is a British philosopher.

Biography 
Budd studied mathematics and philosophy at Jesus College, Cambridge. He taught at University College London from 1970 until 2001, and was appointed the Grote Professor of the Philosophy of Mind and Logic from 1998 until his retirement. He now holds an emeritus position.

He is best known for his work in analytic aesthetics. He has published articles on the expressive powers of music, the aesthetic appreciation of nature, and the values of art.

Regarding the expressive powers of (purely instrumental) music, Budd is known for defending a type of resemblance theory, such that music resembles some feature of emotions. However unlike Peter Kivy and Stephen Davies, Budd argues that music resembles the way that emotions feel.

Budd was elected a Fellow of the British Academy in 1995.

Publications 
The following is a partial list of Budd's publications.

Monographs

 Music and the emotions (1985)
 Wittgenstein's philosophy of psychology (1989)
 Values of art (1995)
 The Aesthetic Appreciation of Nature (2002)
 Aesthetic essays (2008)

Articles

 Budd, M. (1980). The repudiation of emotion: Hanslick on music. The British Journal of Aesthetics, 20(1), 29–43.
 Budd, M. (1987). Wittgenstein on seeing aspects. Mind, 96(381), 1-17.
 Budd, M. (1989). Music and the Communication of Emotion. The Journal of Aesthetics and Art Criticism, 47(2), 129–138.
 Budd, M. (2001). The pure judgement of taste as an aesthetic reflective judgement. The British Journal of Aesthetics, 41(3), 247–260.
 Budd, M. (2003). The acquaintance principle. The British Journal of Aesthetics, 43(4), 386–392.
 Budd, M. (2005). Aesthetic realism and emotional qualities of music. The British Journal of Aesthetics, 45(2), 111–122.
 Budd, M. (2006). The characterization of aesthetic qualities by essential metaphors and quasi-metaphors. The British Journal of Aesthetics, 46(2), 133–143.
 Budd, M. (2007). The intersubjective validity of aesthetic judgements. The British Journal of Aesthetics, 47(4), 333–371.

References

External links 

 British Academy Profile
 UCL page
 Author's page on Philpapers.org

1941 births
Living people
British philosophers
Academics of University College London
Fellows of the British Academy